Eremalche is a genus of flowering plants in the mallow family. They are endemic to the United States desert southwest.

Species:

Eremalche exilis - white mallow
Eremalche parryi - Parry's mallow
Eremalche rotundifolia - desert five-spot

The California endangered plant sometimes called Eremalche kernensis is today generally considered to be a subspecies of Parry's mallow, Eremalche parryi ssp kernensis.

Malveae
Malvaceae genera